In category theory, a branch of mathematics, an ∞-groupoid is an abstract homotopical model for topological spaces. One model uses Kan complexes which are fibrant objects in the category of simplicial sets (with the standard model structure). It is an ∞-category generalization of a groupoid, a category in which every morphism is an isomorphism.

The homotopy hypothesis states that ∞-groupoids are equivalent to spaces up to homotopy.

Globular Groupoids 
Alexander Grothendieck suggested in Pursuing Stacks that there should be an extraordinarily simple model of ∞-groupoids using globular sets, originally called hemispherical complexes. These sets are constructed as presheaves on the globular category . This is defined as the category whose objects are finite ordinals  and morphisms are given bysuch that the globular relations holdThese encode the fact that -morphisms should not be able to see -morphisms. When writing these down as a globular set , the source and target maps are then written asWe can also consider globular objects in a category  as functorsThere was hope originally that such a strict model would be sufficient for homotopy theory, but there is evidence suggesting otherwise. This is because strict ∞-groupoids only model spaces with a trivial Whitehead product.

Examples

Fundamental ∞-groupoid 
Given a topological space  there should be an associated fundamental ∞-groupoid  where the objects are points , 1-morphisms  are represented as paths, 2-morphisms are homotopies of paths, 3-morphisms are homotopies of homotopies, and so on.

Note that taking the fundamental ∞-groupoid of a space  such that  is equivalent to the fundamental n-groupoid . Such a space can be found using the Whitehead tower.

Abelian globular groupoids 
One useful case of globular groupoids comes from a chain complex which is bounded above, hence let's consider a chain complex . There is an associated globular groupoid. We can form a globular set  withand the source morphism  is the projection mapand the target morphism  is the addition of the chain complex map  together with the projection map. This forms a globular groupoid giving a wide class of examples of strict globular groupoids. Moreover, because strict groupoids embed inside weak groupoids, they can act as weak groupoids as well.

Applications

Higher local systems 
One of the basic theorems about local systems is that they can be equivalently described as a functor from the fundamental groupoid  to the category of Abelian groups, the category of -modules, or some other abelian category. That is, a local system is equivalent to giving a functorgeneralizing such a definition requires us to consider not only an abelian category, but also its derived category. A higher local system is then an ∞-functorwith values in some derived category. This has the advantage of letting the higher homotopy groups  to act on the higher local system, from a series of truncations. A toy example to study comes from the Eilenberg–MacLane spaces , or by looking at the terms from the Whitehead tower of a space. Ideally, there should be some way to recover the categories of functors  from their truncations  and the maps  whose fibers should be the categories of -functorsAnother advantage of this formalism is it allows for constructing higher forms of -adic representations by using the etale homotopy type  of a scheme  and construct higher representations of this space, since they are given by functors

Higher gerbes 
Another application of ∞-groupoids is giving constructions of n-gerbes and ∞-gerbes. Over a space  an n-gerbe should be an object  such that when restricted to a small enough subset ,  is represented by an n-groupoid, and on overlaps there is an agreement up to some weak equivalence. Assuming the homotopy hypothesis is correct, this is equivalent to constructing an object  such that over any open subsetis an n-group, or a homotopy n-type. Because the nerve of a category can be used to construct an arbitrary homotopy type, a functor over an site , e.g.will give an example of a higher gerbe if the category  lying over any point  is a non-empty category. In addition, it would be expected this category would satisfy some sort of descent condition.

See also 

Pursuing Stacks
N-group (category theory)
Groupoid
Homotopy type theory

References

Research articles

Applications in algebraic geometry

External links 

Foundations of mathematics
Higher category theory
Homotopy theory
Simplicial sets